Fatou or Fatoumata Camara may refer to: 
 Fatou Camara (journalist), Gambian television presenter and journalist
 Fatou Kiné Camara, Senegalese lawyer and women's rights campaigner
 Fatoumata Camara (wrestler), Guinean freestyle wrestler
 Fatoumata Camara (basketball)